Triple 8 (a.k.a. 888) were a five-piece then four-piece British boy band, who were signed to Polydor Records and Osmosis Records. The group were marketed as the British equivalent of NSYNC, and rivals to manufactured boy bands such as Five, Westlife and A1.

The group had two consecutive Top 10 singles, "Knockout" and "Give Me a Reason", which charted at number 8 and 9 respectively in the UK Singles Chart. Despite moderate chart success, Polydor chose to drop the band in early 2004, leaving their already recorded debut album Heavy W8 unreleased. In 2004, they reformed with new member Stewart Macintosh, and released a third single, "Good 2 Go", which reached number 2 in the UK Indie chart. McIntosh replaced Iain James Farquharson.

Members
The group was originally made up of: 
 David Wilcox: 2001–2003
 Iain James Farquharson, aka Sparx: 2001–2004
 Jamie Bell: 2001–2005
 Josh Barnett: 2001–2005
 Justin Scott: 2001–2005

New members
Iain James Farquharson left the band in 2004 and was replaced by:
 Stewart Macintosh: 2004–2005

After break-up
After Triple 8, Iain James Farquharson, now known as Iain James, subsequently worked with many of the UK's major pop/R&B acts, such as Emeli Sandé, Little Mix and One Direction. He also co-wrote "Running Scared" by Eldar & Nigar. In 2013, he co-penned "Love Kills" which was performed by Roberto Bellarosa, The Belgian Voice winner, in 2013 representing Belgium. It qualified for the Eurovision Song Contest 2013 final placing 12th in Malmö. He is married to Liberty X singer Kelli Young.

Justin Scott is now a property developer, married to Girls Aloud singer Kimberley Walsh. Stewart Macintosh (now known as Stewart Mac) continues to write and perform his own material as an independent artist.

Discography

Albums

Singles

References

Musical groups established in 2003
Musical groups disestablished in 2005
English boy bands
English dance music groups